In the 1838 Iowa Territory Council elections, electors selected councilors to serve in the first Iowa Territory Council. All 13 members of the Territory Council were elected. Councilors served one-year terms.

The Iowa Territory existed from July 4, 1838, until December 28, 1846, when Iowa was admitted to the Union as a state. At the time, the Iowa Territory had a Legislative Assembly consisting of an upper chamber (i.e., the Territory Council) and a lower chamber (i.e., the Territory House of Representatives).

Following the organization of the first Territory Council, Whig Councilor Jesse B. Browne of Lee County was chosen as the President of the Territory Council. Democrats held a majority of seats in the first Iowa Territory Council following the 1838 general election with seven seats to Whigs' six seats.

Summary of Results 

Source:

Detailed Results
NOTE: The Iowa General Assembly does not contain detailed vote totals for Territory Council elections in 1838.

See also
 Elections in Iowa

External links
District boundaries for the Territory Council in 1838:
Iowa Territory Council Districts 1838-1840 map

References

Iowa Council
Iowa
Iowa Senate elections